Bailongia is an extinct genus of arthropod known from a single species Bailongia longicaudata (longicaudata from Latin: "long-tailed") found in the Cambrian Stage 4 aged Guanshan Biota of Yunnan, China. It was around 5mm long and had a large head shield, nine overlapping tapering tergites and a relatively elongate tailspine. It has been recovered in a relatively basal position within Artiopoda, more derived than Squamacula or Protosutura, but outside Trilobitomorpha or Vicissicaudata.

Phylogeny 
After Jiao et al. 2021.

References 

Artiopoda
Cambrian arthropods of Asia
Cambrian China
Paleontology in Yunnan
Fossil taxa described in 2021
Cambrian genus extinctions